Self-regulation may refer to:

Emotional self-regulation
Self-control, in sociology/psychology
Self-regulated learning, in educational psychology
Self-regulation theory (SRT), a system of conscious personal management
Industry self-regulation, the process of monitoring ones own adherance to industry standards
Self-regulatory organization, in business and finance
Homeostasis, a state of steady internal conditions maintained by living things
Emergence, the phenomenon in which unpredictable outcomes emerge from complex systems
Self-regulating variable resistance cables used for trace heating
Spontaneous order

See also 
Self-limiting (disambiguation)